Tylopilus nicaraguensis is a bolete fungus in the family Boletaceae. Found in Nicaragua, where it grows under Pinus caribaea, it was described as new to science in 1983.

References

External links

nicaraguensis
Fungi described in 1983
Fungi of Central America